Gagarin is a village in the Sevan Municipality of the Gegharkunik Province of Armenia. It was founded in 1955 and named after the cosmonaut Yuri Gagarin. Administratively, the village is under the subordination of the Sevan municipality.

Gallery

References

External links 

Populated places in Gegharkunik Province
Populated places established in 1955
Cities and towns built in the Soviet Union
1955 establishments in Armenia